John Moubray Russell St John, 20th Baron St John of Bletso TD (3 August 1917 – 13 April 1976) was an English peer.

The only son of Moubray St John, 19th Baron St John of Bletso and his wife Evelyn, John St John became the 20th Baron Lord St John of Bletso on the death of his father in 1934. He was living at a hotel in Dublin and died unmarried in 1976, aged 58, and the title passed to a distant cousin.

References
 Burke's Baronetage & Peerage

1917 births
1976 deaths
John
Barons St John of Bletso
20th-century English nobility